János Aczél may refer to:
 János Aczél (royal secretary) (died 1523), Hungarian poet
 János Aczél (mathematician) (1924–2020), Hungarian-Canadian mathematician